Igor Kováč (born May 12, 1969 in Krompachy) is a former Slovak track and field athlete  who specialised in the 110 metres hurdles. He is best known for winning the bronze medal at the 1997 World Championships in Athens. In addition, he competed at the 1992 Olympics for Czechoslovakia and the 1996 Olympics for Slovakia.

International competitions

References

Living people
1969 births
People from Krompachy
Sportspeople from the Košice Region
Slovak male hurdlers
Czechoslovak male hurdlers
Olympic athletes of Czechoslovakia
Athletes (track and field) at the 1992 Summer Olympics
Olympic athletes of Slovakia
Athletes (track and field) at the 1996 Summer Olympics
World Athletics Championships athletes for Slovakia
World Athletics Championships athletes for Czechoslovakia
World Athletics Championships medalists